Suasa was an ancient Roman town in what is now the comune of Castelleone di Suasa, Marche, Italy. It is located in the Pian Volpello locality, in the valley of the Cesano River.

History
Suasa was founded by the Romans in the early 3rd century BC after the Battle of Sentinum (295 BC), in a territory inhabited by the Senones. The town was crossed by a secondary branch of the Via Flaminia and by the Via Salaria Gallica, which connected it to Forum Sempronii (Fossombrone) and Ostra. In 232 BC, it became a prefecture and, in the 1st century BC, a municipium.

Suasa started to decline from the 3rd century; in 409, it was sacked by Alarich's Goths during his march against Rome (see Sack of Rome). It was abandoned in the 6th century after the Gothic War, the population moving to nearby settlements.

The remains have been excavated by the University of Bologna since 1987. The edifices found include:
an amphitheater
a theater
the Coiedii domus
a late-Republican era domus
the cardo maximus
a necropolis

The Archaeological Park 

The Suasa archaeological park is an archaeological site in Castelleone di Suasa (province of Ancona, Marche, Italy).

It includes the remains of the ancient town of Suasa, abandoned in the 6th century AD. The site comprises an open-air museum of a Roman house (the Coiedii domus), of great interest because of its size and architectonic complexity.

The domus was inhabited over a long period of time. Its development peaked in the 2nd century AD. The mosaics discovered in the interior are splendid and are the most important unitary complex of the Marches. Mythological, floral, and geometric scenes can be admired, but above all, a magnificent marble floor created with over fifteen different kinds of stone.

Part of the site is protected by a roof and a walkway allows visitors to explore it.

The large amphitheatre lies at the foot of the hill. During summer it hosts theatre shows.

See also

 Ancient Ostra
 Archaeological Park of Urbs Salvia
 Potentia (ancient city)
 Ricina
 Sentinum
 Septempeda

References

External links

 Official website: Consorzio Città Romana di Suasa - Progetto Suasa 
 Suasa - University of Bologna, Department of Archaeology  
 Consorzio Città Romana di Suasa

Roman towns and cities in Italy
Roman sites of the Marche
Ancient Roman theatres in Italy
Roman amphitheatres in Italy
Tourist attractions in le Marche
Archaeological sites in le Marche
Museums in Marche
Archaeological museums in Italy
Museums of ancient Rome in Italy
Archaeological parks
Populated places established in the 3rd century BC
Former populated places in Italy
Castelleone di Suasa